Hadith Qudsi or Hadith Qudse  (meaning "pure" or "holy Hadith") is a special category of Hadith, the compendium of sayings attributed to the Islamic prophet Muhammad. It is stated these Hadiths are unique because their content is attributed to God but the actual wording was credited to Muhammad.  This may be one of the reasons they are not included in the Quranic revelations, which are considered to be the verbatim word of God but rather are given a special category, thus occupying a status between Quran and normal Hadith text.

Differences between Quranic Text and Hadith Qudsi 
The following differences have been noted between Quranic text and Hadith Qudsi.

Examples 
Such text can be found in primary as well as secondary sources of Hadith literature.

Abu Hurayrah, who said  that the Messenger of Allah said:"When Allah decreed the Creation He pledged Himself by writing in His book which is laid down with Him: My mercy prevails over my wrath."

Abu Hurayrah reported that Allah’s messenger said:Allah, Mighty and Exalted is He, said: "If My servant likes to meet me, I like to meet him, and if he dislikes to meet Me, I dislike to meet him."

Umar ibn Khattab, narrated that the Messenger of Allah said:“Perhaps Allah has looked at those who witnessed Badr and said, ‘Do whatever you like, for I have forgiven you.’”

Publications 

Numerous publications have focused solely on Qudse Hadiths, quoting between 40 and 110 of such, from primary Hadith texts. These include:

 An-Nawawis Forty Hadith Qudsi 
 110 Hadith Qudsi

Appendix

Notes

References 

Hadith